Bakenranef, known by the ancient Greeks as Bocchoris (Ancient Greek: , ;) or Bochchoris was briefly a king of the 24th Dynasty of Egypt. Based at Sais in the western Delta, he ruled Lower Egypt from c. 725 to 720 BC. Though the Ptolemaic period Egyptian historian Manetho considers him the sole member of the 24th Dynasty, modern scholars include his father Tefnakht in that dynasty. Although Sextus Julius Africanus quotes Manetho as stating that "Bocchoris" ruled for six years, some modern scholars again differ and assign him a shorter reign of only five years, based on evidence from an Apis Bull burial stela. It establishes that Bakenranef's reign ended only at the start of his 6th regnal year which, under the Egyptian dating system, means he had a reign of 5 full years. Bakenranef's prenomen or royal name, Wahkare, means "Constant is the Spirit of Re" in Egyptian.

Literary sources 
Manetho is the source for two events from Bakenranef's reign. The first is the story that a lamb uttered the prophecy that Egypt would be conquered by the Assyrians, a story later repeated by such classical authors as Claudius Aelianus (De Natura Animalis 12.3). The second was that Bakenranef was captured by Shebitqo, a king of the 25th Dynasty, who executed Bakenrenef by having him burned alive. A Kushite king, Shebitqo extended his rule over the whole of Egypt, which had been split since the 21st Dynasty.

Diodorus Siculus, writing about three centuries after Manetho, adds some different details. Diodorus states that although Bakenranef was "contemptible in appearance", he was wiser than his predecessors (1.65). The Egyptians attributed to him a law concerning contracts, which provided for a way to discharge debts where no bond was signed; it was observed down to Diodorus' time (1.79). For this, and other acts, Diodorus included "Bocchoris" as one of the six most important lawgivers of ancient Egypt. For a minor kinglet briefly in control of the Nile Delta, this is an unexpectedly prominent ranking: "He was a surprising choice," Robin Lane Fox observes, "Perhaps some Greeks, unknown to us, had had close dealings with him; from his reign we have scarab-seals bearing his Egyptian name, one of which found its way into a contemporary Greek grave on Ischia up near the Bay of Naples." Ischia was the earliest of eighth-century BC Greek colonies in Italy.

The Roman historian Tacitus mentions that many Greek and Roman writers thought he had a part in the origin of the Jewish nation:

Shebitqo deposed and executed Bakenranef by burning him alive at the stake. This effectively ended the short-lived 24th Dynasty of Egypt as a potential rival to the Nubian 25th Dynasty. Although the Manethonic and classical traditions maintain that it was Shebitqo's invasion which brought Egypt under Kushite rule, the king burning his opponent, Bocchoris-Bakenranef, alive, there is no direct evidence that Shebitqo did slay Bakenranef, and although earlier scholarship generally accepted the tradition, it has recently been treated more sceptically.

Legal reforms 
King Bakenranef has been credited with initiating a land reform, but the brevity of his reign and the small geographical extent of the area he ruled, together with the indirect character of the historical evidence for it, has cast some doubt upon this. Diodorus credits Bakenranef with abolishing debt slavery, a claim based upon a now-lost work by the historian Hecateus of Abdera. It is possible that Hecateus invented the story in order to support an ideological debate over debt slavery in Greek society.

Contemporary records 
Despite the importance implied by these writers, few contemporary records of Bakenranef have survived. The chief inscription of his reign concerns the death and burial of an Apis bull during Years 5 and 6 of his reign; the remainder are a few stelae that Auguste Mariette recovered while excavating the Serapeum of Saqqara. In a tomb in Tarquinia in Italy was found an inscribed vase with his names.

References

External links 

8th-century BC Pharaohs
Pharaohs of the Twenty-fourth Dynasty of Egypt
8th-century BC births
8th-century BC deaths
Executed Egyptian people
Executed ancient Egyptian people
Nile Delta
People executed by ancient Egypt
People executed by Egypt by burning
1st-millennium BC executions